The , is an underground water infrastructure project in Kasukabe, Saitama, Japan. It is the world's largest underground flood water diversion facility, built to mitigate overflowing of the city's major waterways and rivers during rain and typhoon seasons. It is located between Showa and Kasukabe in Saitama prefecture, on the outskirts of the city of Tokyo in the Greater Tokyo Area.

Work on the project started in 1992 and was completed by early 2006.

See also 
 Tunnel and Reservoir Plan (in Chicago)
 Basilica Cistern (in Istanbul)
 Underground Construction
 Stormwater
 Sewerage

References

External links 
 (including photos) 

Aqueducts in Japan
Buildings and structures in Saitama Prefecture
Flood control projects
Flood control in Japan
Geography of Saitama Prefecture
Macro-engineering
Science and technology in Japan
Tourist attractions in Saitama Prefecture
Water tunnels
Drainage tunnels
Tunnels in Japan